Şəkili is a village and municipality in the Goychay Rayon of Azerbaijan. It has a population of 316.

References

Populated places in Goychay District